Whitlock may refer to:


Places
 Whitlock, Tennessee, United States, an unincorporated community
 Whitlock Valley, Arizona, United States
 Whitlock Island, Western Australia
 Whitlock, original name of Bay Terrace station, a railway station in Bay Terrace, Staten Island, New York, United States
 Whitlock's End, a hamlet in Dickens Heath parish, West Midlands, England
 Whitlocks End railway station

People
 Whitlock (surname), people with the surname
 Whitlock Nicoll (1786–1838), English physician

Businesses
 Whitlock (manufacturing), a former London-based carriage and automobile manufacturer
 F. Whitlock & Sons Ltd, pickle and sauce manufacturers